If You Saw His Heart is a French drama film, directed by Joan Chemla and released in 2017. Based partially on Guillermo Rosales's novel Boarding House, the film stars Gael García Bernal as a Daniel, a Roma thief on the run from the vengeful brother of his former friend Costel (Nahuel Pérez Biscayart), who believes Daniel to be responsible for Costel's accidental death.

The film premiered at the 2017 Toronto International Film Festival, in the Platform stream.

References

External links
 

2017 films
2017 drama films
French drama films
2010s French-language films
2010s French films